Ademollo is an Italian surname. Notable people with the surname include:

Carlo Ademollo (1824–1911), Italian painter, nephew of Luigi
Luigi Ademollo (1764–1849), Italian painter

See also
Ademola

Italian-language surnames